Calling All Cars may refer to:
Calling All Cars (band), an Australian rock band
Calling All Cars (radio program), an old radio program
Calling All Cars (1935 film), an American crime film
Calling All Cars (1954 film), a comedy/documentary film starring Cardew Robinson
"Calling All Cars", a song by Senses Fail from the album Still Searching
"Calling All Cars" (The Sopranos)
Calling All Cars!, a 2007 downloadable PlayStation Network video game